"You Were Meant for Me" is a popular American song with music by Nacio Herb Brown and lyrics by Arthur Freed, published in 1929.

It was introduced by Charles King in the 1929 musical film The Broadway Melody. It was also sung by King dubbing for Conrad Nagel in the feature film The Hollywood Revue of 1929 and performed by Bull Montana and Winnie Lightner in the film The Show of Shows also in 1929. Later, the song was performed by Frank Morgan in the 1940 musical film Hullabaloo and was included in Penny Serenade (1941, with Irene Dunne and Cary Grant). Gene Kelly sang the song and danced to it with Debbie Reynolds in the 1952 musical film Singin' in the Rain.

Recorded versions
Joe Pass and John Pisano's album Duets (1991)
Ray Anthony
Walt Roesner and the Capitolians (1929)
Perry Como
Bing Crosby included the song in a medley on his album Join Bing and Sing Along (1959)
Maurice Chevalier
Billy Daniels
Helen Forrest
The Four Lads
Jackie Gleason
Coleman Hawkins
Dick Jurgens
Gene Kelly
Ben Berlin Orchestra
Charles King recorded in Hollywood on April 11, 1929 and released on Victor 21965.
Meade "Lux" Lewis
Gordon MacRae recorded on December 16, 1947 and released on Capitol 15027.
Audra McDonald
Rose Murphy
Nat Pierce
Eileen Rodgers
Nat Shilkret and his Victor Orchestra
Claude Thornhill and his orchestra
Art Van Damme
Paul Weston and his orchestra
Carlos Gardel (04/06/1930) Spanish version: Enrique Cadícamo
Sting, for the soundtrack of the 1998 film The Object of My Affection

References
 Who Wrote that Song Dick Jacobs & Harriet Jacobs, published by Writer's Digest Books, 1993

Songs with music by Nacio Herb Brown
Songs with lyrics by Arthur Freed
1929 songs